Leander Paes and Lisa Raymond were the defending champions but Paes did not compete. Raymond competed with Paul Haarhuis but lost in the third round to Mark Knowles and Elena Likhovtseva.

Donald Johnson and Kimberly Po defeated Lleyton Hewitt and Kim Clijsters in the final, 6–4, 7–6(7–3) to win the mixed doubles tennis title at the 2000 Wimbledon Championships.

Seeds

  Todd Woodbridge /  Rennae Stubbs (second round)
  Paul Haarhuis /  Lisa Raymond (third round)
  Ellis Ferreira /  Nicole Arendt (first round)
  Jonas Björkman /  Anna Kournikova (first round)
  Rick Leach /  Amanda Coetzer (quarterfinals)
  John-Laffnie de Jager /  Manon Bollegraf (quarterfinals)
  Piet Norval /  Katarina Srebotnik (first round)
  Donald Johnson /  Kimberly Po (champions)
 n/a
  Mark Knowles /  Elena Likhovtseva (quarterfinals)
  Wayne Black /  Cara Black (first round)
  David Adams /  Mariaan de Swardt (third round)
  Nicklas Kulti /  Åsa Carlsson (second round)
  Daniel Orsanic /  Caroline Vis (first round)
  Martín García /  Laura Montalvo (first round)
  Brian MacPhie /  Patricia Tarabini (first round)

Draw

Finals

Top half

Section 1

Section 2

Bottom half

Section 3

Section 4

References

External links

2000 Wimbledon Championships on WTAtennis.com
2000 Wimbledon Championships – Doubles draws and results at the International Tennis Federation

X=Mixed Doubles
Wimbledon Championship by year – Mixed doubles